Charles Julius Brune (16 April 1843 – 13 January 1877) was a 19th-century amateur cricketer. Born in Matanzas, Cuba, Brune first boarded at Godolphin School in Hammersmith, London, and later progressed to the University of Cambridge, where he attended Caius and Downing Colleges. Having played for an All-England Eleven as early as the 1863 season, whilst at Cambridge he was a regular player for the university's cricket team, playing fourteen first-class and numerous other matches for the side between 1866 and 1870. A medium-fast round-arm bowler, Brune was quite successful in his appearances for Cambridge, taking 57 wickets at an average of 14.28, including four five-wicket hauls. His best bowling figures, 8/31, came against the Marylebone Cricket Club (MCC) during the 1869 season, while in the 1867 edition of The University Match (held annually against Oxford), he took 5/64.

Brune had first played county matches for Middlesex during the 1866 season, and was a regular player for the side into the early 1870s. Later becoming a member of the MCC, he also played regularly for composite and regional teams, as well as local club teams. As the holder of amateur status, Brune occasionally featured in "Gentlemen" sides, making an appearance for "Gentlemen of the South" during the 1875 season, a team captained by W. G. Grace. His last appearance at first-class level was that year's edition of the Gentlemen v. Players fixture; he did not bowl during the game, with Grace and his cousin, Walter Gilbert, taking 17 wickets. Brune died at Boulogne, France, in January 1877, aged 33.

References

1843 births
1877 deaths
Alumni of Downing College, Cambridge
Alumni of Gonville and Caius College, Cambridge
Cambridge University cricketers
Cuban cricketers
Cuban emigrants to France
Cuban emigrants to England
Cuban people of English descent
English cricketers
English mechanical engineers
Gentlemen cricketers
Marylebone Cricket Club cricketers
Middlesex cricketers
People educated at Godolphin and Latymer School
Sportspeople from Matanzas
Gentlemen of the South cricketers
Gentlemen of England cricketers
Oxford and Cambridge Universities cricketers
R. D. Walker's XI cricketers